The British Academy of Management (BAM), founded in 1986, is a learned society dedicated  to advancing the academic discipline of management in the United Kingdom. It is a member of the Academy of Social Sciences. The academy runs two peer-reviewed academic journals: the British Journal of Management and the International Journal of Management Reviews.  The headquarters of the British Academy of Management is in London, United Kingdom.

History

Foundation 
The British Academy of Management was founded in 1986, exactly 50 years after the AoM was formed in Chicago. Professor Sir Cary Cooper CBE was its first President and Andrew Pettigrew was its first chairman. During the AoM conference in San Diego in 1985 they realize the lack of a multidisciplinary association in the UK and decided to establish BAM.

The biggest challenges for this new organisation were to set up a constitution and to exercise good governance through a strong executive committee. The inaugural conference of BAM was at the University of Warwick in 1987. This was organised by Andrew Pettigrew. With over 200 delegates, the conference had an immediate success.

Early days 
From the mid 1980s to the early 1990s, the management of the academy was still based on an amateur approach, because of the moving from one place to another. The nomadic life of the BAM office and the lack of a centralized system meant that outgoing chairpersons packaged the documents and sent them on to the institution of the new chair. Sometimes, this delivery arrived without all the key papers. BAM headquarters had to be moved from one city to another for a bit more than a decade, until they found a stable home in 2002 in London. Thus, the records eventually delivered to HQ were not very comprehensive.

Conferences 
In the 1990s, BAM struggled to find conference venues, and to attract persons due to the fact that the attendance was low. As the time passed there was a growth in both domestic and international attendance, especially from Europe. At this time, it was observed that the conferences were more about social interaction than about the discussion of serious research. Combining both consistently high academic quality and the fun factor became a priority by the late 1990s.

The first BAM Workshop took place on 5 January 1989 entitled ‘Organisation and Strategic Decision Making’ at Bradford Management Centre, University of Bradford. It had 69 participants who came from England, Wales, Scotland, Northern Ireland, Brazil, US, China and France. It was organised by Richard Butler, Richard Pike and John Sharp.

First BAM Journal 
BAM's founders wanted to start publishing a journal. Cary Cooper managed one of the AoM divisions that had its own journal and he suggested that BAM should do the same.  Cooper coordinated a small group from Council who interviewed a number of  publishing companies for a five-year contract, John Wiley won the first contract. The British Journal of Management (BJM) was launched in early 1990 and had 4 issues a year running into 64 pages. The General Editor was David Otley and the Associate Editors were John Burgoyne, John McGee, Roy Payne, Nigel Piercy and Roy Rothwell. BJM purpose was to receive articles from a full range of business and management disciplines and to have a multi and inter disciplinary orientation.

The formation of Special Interest Groups (SIGs) 
One of the significant changes to BAM's structure happened in 1999 with the formation of Special Interest Groups (SIGs). The aim of the SIGs was to encourage greater member participation and to provide a more diverse range of activities for members. The first SIGs were Entrepreneurship and Innovation and Management Consultancy but Learning and Knowledge, Interorganisational Relations, Performance Management, Philosophy of Management, Research Methodology, Creativity and Creative Industries and E-Business soon joined them. The SIG structure proved a thriving way to organise BAM's  conferences, offering richer benefits for the membership. SIGs also provided new opportunities for less experienced academics to play active roles in the academy. There are now 23 SIGs representing the full field of management studies.

International Journal of Management Reviews (IJMR) 
The success of the British Journal of Management (BJM) was joined by BAM's acquisition of the International Journal of Management Reviews (IJMR). Cary Cooper and Alan Pearson had been the first editors.

Governance 
The British Academy of Management has an executive committee and a Council. It is a Registered Charity (no. 1117999) and is a Company (no. 05869337) Limited by  Guarantee and registered in England and Wales.

BAM Executive 
An executive committee, is elected to develop the strategy, work with Council and ensure an effective implementation of the chosen strategy. In 2014 the leadership team was remodelled. This consist of a President, a chair, five elected vice-chair portfolios and an appointed Treasurer. In January 2018 BAM's first CEO, Madeleine Barrows, was appointed to work with the Executive to develop and implement strategy and to lead the office team.
 President : Professor Nic Beech
 Chair:  Professor Katy Mason
 Treasurer: Dr Neil Pyper
 Vice Chairs:
 Equality, Diversity and Inclusivity: Professor Martyna Śliwa
 Research and Publications: Professor Emma Bell, Professor Nelarine Cornelius 
 Academic Affairs of Conference and Capacity Building: Professor Nicholas O'Regan, Professor Helen Shipton
 Special Interest Groups: Professor Maureen Meadows, Professor Savvas Papagiannidis
 Management Knowledge and Education: Professor Lisa Anderson, Professor Mark Loon

BAM Council 
The council, which comprises approximately 50 people elected for a minimum of 3 years by the general membership, or co-opted by the Executive, represents the interests of the membership and contributes to the activities of the learned society through working with the Vice-Chairs. The role of Council is to elaborate strategy and policy, and to implement strategy in conjunction with the Executive and Academy office.

Special Interest Groups (SIGs) 
Special Interest Groups are networks of researchers that are focused in a specific area of management research. They organize events throughout the year and provide the members with an academic forum for the discussion on relevant topics.

SIGs are run by BAM members, with support from the BAM office. They organise workshop and events on topics relevant to their research area, and take the lead in managing the academic programme at the annual BAM Conference.

Here are the 23 SIG networks:
 Corporate Governance
 Cultural and Creative Industries
 e-Business and e-Government
 Entrepreneurship
Financial Management
 Gender in Management
 Human Resource Management
 Identity
 Innovation
 Inter-Organizational Collaboration: partnerships, alliances and networks
 International Business and International Management
 Knowledge and Learning
 Leadership and Leadership Development
 Management and Business History
 Marketing and Retail
 Operations, Logistics and Supply Chain Management
 Organisational Psychology
 Organisational Transformation, Change and Development
 Performance Management
 Research Methodology
 Strategy
 Sustainable and Responsible Business

BAM Annual conference 
The British Academy of Management (BAM) Conference is for business and management scholars.

 The conference has grown over 40% in size in the last few years. 
The 2019 Conference, the 33rd, was attended by over 950 delegates from 53 countries.
There are 30 different Conference tracks.
The 2020 and 2021 conferences have been held / are to be held virtually owing to the global coronavirus pandemic.

Journals

British Journal of Management (BJM) 
 The British Journal of Management (BJM) is the official journal of the British Academy of Management. It is published four times a year (plus an annual supplement), welcoming papers that make inter-disciplinary or multi-disciplinary contributions, as well as research from within the traditional disciplines and managerial functions.

BJM has a 2019 impact factor of 3.023, ranked 60 out of 152 in the Business category and 88 out of 226 in the Management category.

The Co-Editors in Chief of the British Journal of Management are Professor Douglas Cumming (Florida Atlantic University, USA) and Professor Shlomo Y. Tarba (University of Birmingham, UK).

International Journal of Management Reviews (IJMR) 
 The International Journal of Management Reviews (IJMR) is the official journal of the British Academy of Management. It is published four times a year . The journal includes all main subjects of management sub-discipline - from accounting and entrepreneurship to strategy and technology management. Each issue is composed of five or six review articles which examine all the relevant literature published on a specific aspect of the sub-discipline.

IJMR has a 2019 impact factor of 8.631, ranked 5th out of 226 in the Management category and 5th out of 152 in the Business category.

The Co-Editors in Chief of the International Journal of Management Reviews are Dr Dermot Breslin (University of Sheffield), Professor Jamie Callahan (Northumbria University), Dr Marian Iszatt-White (Lancaster University), with Professor Catherine Bailey (King's College London).

Associated Organisations 
 Academy of Social Sciences (ACSS)
 Chartered Association of Business Schools (CABS)
 Australian and New Zealand Academy of Management (ANZAM)
 Academy of Management (AoM)
 British Academy
 British Library
 Chartered Institute of Marketing (CIM)
 Chartered Institute of Personnel and Development (CIPD)
 Chartered Management Institute (CMI)
 Economic and Social Research Council (ESRC)
 European Academy of Management (EURAM)
 Higher Education Academy (HEA)
 Indian Academy of Management (INDAM)
Irish Academy of Management (IAM)
 Institute of Small Business and Entrepreneurship (ISBE)
 The Society for the Advancement of Management Studies (SAMS)
Società Italiana di Management (SIMA)

References 

1986 establishments in the United Kingdom
Learned societies of the United Kingdom
Management organizations
Non-profit organisations based in London
Organizations established in 1986
Scholarly communication
Social sciences organizations